Yummy Dough (also known by its original German name Essknete) is a baking mixture which, after the addition of water, is kneaded into a smooth dough. It was invented in 2005 and first introduced to the market in 2007. The product's consistency is similar to that of modeling clay, such as Play-Doh, except it is edible raw and can be baked. Its coloring agents are all vegetable-based.

History
Yummy Dough was invented by Stefan Kaczmarek, an IT worker from Idstein, Germany, in fall 2005. Kaczmarek credits his two daughters as having the original idea for the product because they "wanted to finally have dough they can play with as well as eat". It was first mentioned in a radio broadcast by the Hessischer Rundfunk, which raised awareness of the product significantly. Kaczmarek reportedly had not planned to market the product but decided otherwise after the reaction to the broadcast. It was premiered as a commercial product at Anuga alimentary exhibition in 2007, where it won the "Taste 07" award for innovation. This sparked the interest of several large grocery and toy chains; Kaczmarek declined an offer by German food manufacturer Dr. Oetker and instead founded his own company, 123 Nährmittel GmbH, to distribute the product nationwide. Yummy Dough was first sold in supermarkets in 2007, starting with the German grocery chains Hit and REWE. The product is produced by the RUF Lebensmittelwerke in Quakenbrück.

In 2009, it became available in North America and is distributed by Canadian-based toy distributor PlaSmart Inc. The product was featured in season 4 of the Canadian version of Dragons' Den, in which Kaczmarek, and his Canadian partner, Timothy Kimber of PlaSmart Inc., received C$500,000 from investors Kevin O'Leary, W. Brett Wilson, and Jim Treliving, in exchange for a 3.5% cut of revenues, once the investment has been recouped. Further plans also include marketing the product in Asia.

Yummy Dough was pulled from the market and has since been taken over by a German company with new branding and is only available in the EU marketplace.

See also
 PlaSmart Inc.

References

External links
 Yummy Dough (Essknete) official website
 PlaSmart official website
 https://www.kosmos.de

Art and craft toys
2000s toys
Products introduced in 2005
Food and drink introduced in 2005